Night of the Scarecrow is a 1995 American horror film directed by Jeff Burr.

Plot 

After a devastating drought, townsfolk make a deal with a warlock that he has complete immunity in exchange for a bountiful harvest. At first all is well but the warlock eventually corrupts the townsfolk with hedonism. When mayor Silas Goodman's own daughter is seduced, Silas has had enough and plans with the uncorrupted townsfolk to dispose of the warlock for good. After stealing the warlock's magic book, the mayor and townsfolk drug the warlock and crucify him until he succumbs. The townsfolk burn his corpse and put the charred bones in a coffin. They put a charm on the coffin to make the cornfield forever bountiful, and bury it under the cornfield. Silas marks a page in the spell book showing how to destroy the warlock, as a precaution should his spirit ever be released, and creates an edict that all his descendants must erect a scarecrow as a reminder of the warlock.

In the modern day, Silas' descendant Mayor Goodman decides to build a mall on the cornfield. Two drunken workers driving the bulldozer at night accidentally break the stone coffin, releasing the spirit of the warlock which then possesses the scarecrow. The Scarecrow goes on a killing spree to retrieve his magic book, to regain his body and exact revenge on the town. The pastor reveals the story of the town to his niece Claire Goodman and her boyfriend before being killed by the Scarecrow. The Scarecrow kills the mayor and his wife when they refuse to divulge the whereabouts of the magic book. Sheriff Goodman comforts Claire and reveals that all first born of the Goodman family are given the magic book and told that if anything happens to him, his family should look for it in the attic as it contains something extremely important. They find the magic book.

The Sheriff defends his family and enables Claire and her boyfriend to escape before being killed. The book reveals that the only way to destroy the scarecrow is to destroy the warlock's bones. At first they try to use acid to dissolve the bones but the boyfriend spills the acid. Clare finally defeats the scarecrow by pulverizing the bones under a rock crusher.

Cast 
 Elizabeth Barondes: Claire Goodman
 John Mese: Dillon
 Stephen Root: Uncle Frank/The Sherriff
 Bruce Glover: Uncle Thaddeus
 Dirk Blocker: Uncle George
 Howard Swain: The Scarecrow
 Gary Lockwood: Mayor Goodman
 John Hawkes: Danny Thompson
 William Joseph Barker: Kyle
 Martine Beswick: Barbara
 Cristi Harris: Stephanie

Reception 

While Variety wrote that the director "has more luck with physical scenes than he does with coaxing inspired performances out of his actors", Blu-ray.com wrote that the director "stages things very effectively and gets some good performances out of a game cast." A reviewer for DVD Talk  did not like the "inept circa-1995 CGI".

Jeffrey Kaufman of Blu-ray.com compared a violent scene in the film to a scene in another horror film with a murderous scarecrow, the television film Dark Night of the Scarecrow.
Eric Hansen of Variety wrote of the film and its original VHS release, "A moderately exciting, average monster movie with good production values and a few good ideas, “Night of the Scarecrow” looks to have its longest life on homevideo." A review for TV Guide says, "A healthy dose of directorial style and energy makes this prosaic low-budget chiller a tense, entertaining diversion."

Adam Tyner, writing for DVD Talk, said "It's kind of interesting seeing some of the familiar faces in the cast, and Night of the Scarecrow does trot out a few really nice looking setpieces, but none of that's enough to salvage this limp, lifeless, uninspired, instantly forgettable slasher flick. Skip It."

Home media 
The original video release was in 1995 on VHS, distributed by Republic Pictures. The film was released on DVD and Blu-ray by Olive Films in 2013, with the same special features – an audio commentary with director Jeff Burr, a making of video, and a picture gallery.

See also 
 The Night of the Scarecrow
 Dark Night of the Scarecrow
 Scarecrow
 Scarecrows

References

External links 
 
 

1995 films
1995 horror films
American supernatural horror films
Films directed by Jeff Burr
Republic Pictures films
Supernatural slasher films
1990s slasher films
American ghost films
American films about revenge
American exploitation films
American splatter films
1990s English-language films
1990s American films